Dennis George Mortimer (born 5 April 1952) is an English former footballer who played as a midfielder and captained Aston Villa. He made nearly 600 appearances in the Football League playing for Coventry City, Aston Villa, Sheffield United, Brighton & Hove Albion and Birmingham City.

Playing career
Mortimer was born in Liverpool. He began his career with Coventry City, where he came through the ranks to make more than 200 first-team appearances as a midfielder. His displays for Coventry attracted the attention of several top clubs, and he joined Aston Villa for £175,000 on Christmas Eve 1975.

Mortimer captained Villa to the 1980–81 Football League championship, the club's first League title for more than 70 years. He then led the team to victory in the 1982 European Cup Final; a 1–0 win against Bayern Munich in the De Kuip Stadium came courtesy of Peter Withe's goal, and made it six years in a row that English teams had lifted the trophy. After the game, Mortimer swapped his match shirt with an unknown Bayern player and has since attempted to recover it. From 1975 to 1985 he made 406 appearances for Villa scoring 36 goals.

After leaving Villa, Mortimer moved to Brighton & Hove Albion but was only there a year before returning to the Midlands with Birmingham City, thereby breaking the second-city taboo by playing for City and Villa.

Mortimer was capped by England at youth and under-23 level and captained England B, but was never capped for the full England team.

Post-playing career
During the 1988–89 season, Mortimer was player-manager of non-league club Redditch United. Mortimer became the PFA football in the community officer at West Bromwich Albion F.C. in 1991. Later he would become reserve team coach under the management of Ossie Ardiles and Keith Burkinshaw. When Ardiles left to coach Tottenham Hotspur F.C. Burkinshaw became manager and Mortimer moved up to first team coach.

He worked for The Professional Football Association as regional director of coaching in the Midlands area from 1996 to 2005.Mortimer joined the Birmingham City Football in the Community coaching scheme in 2006–2007. Mortimer joined the Football Association education coaching department in 2008 where he worked until the end of 2015. Mortimer is now retired. He provided commentary for BBC West Midlands Radio when he first retired from the game.

Mortimer received an honorary doctorate from the University of Worcester in 2011 for "his outstanding contribution to football".

Honours
Aston Villa
 Football League First Division: 1980–81
 Football League Cup: 1976–77
 FA Charity Shield: 1981 (shared) 
 European Cup: 1981–82
 European Super Cup: 1982
 Intercontinental Cup runner-up: 1982

References

External links
 

1952 births
Living people
Footballers from Liverpool
English footballers
England youth international footballers
England under-23 international footballers
England B international footballers
Association football midfielders
Coventry City F.C. players
Aston Villa F.C. players
Sheffield United F.C. players
Brighton & Hove Albion F.C. players
Birmingham City F.C. players
Redditch United F.C. players
English Football League players
English football managers
Redditch United F.C. managers